The Ohai Railway Board Heritage Trust is a defunct railway preservation society that was formed to preserve Southland's rail history. The trust was formerly based at Wairio on the Wairio Branch in the former Ohai Railway Board workshops, and owned a number of locomotives and items of rolling stock, including the remains of two P class 2-8-0 tender locomotives.

Trust Lapses
In 2006 the ORBHT's lease on the former ORB workshops and yard at Wairio was allowed to lapse after the trust decided no to pursue the idea of running heritage services from Bluff to Ohai. The trust's locomotives and rolling stock remained on the site; as of January 2015, most of the trust's stock remained at Wairio with the exception of diesel shunting locomotive DS 201 and the remains of steam locomotive P 60, which had moved to Dunedin and Lumsden respectively.

Banned
In December 2011, members of the ORBHT were banned from entering the Wairio yard and workshop buildings after being served a trespass notice by KiwiRail. The notice was served on the grounds that the trust's members had not sought permission from KiwiRail to access the site; one of the trust members responded by saying the trust had become concerned with the neglected state of the site and the potential fire risk, and had stepped in to clean the site up.

Locomotives and Rolling Stock
In 2002, the ORBHT purchased two diesel shunting locomotives, DS 201 from Alliance Meats at Lorneville and the former Ohai Railway Board Mitsubishi shunter NO 1 which was then stored at Wairio. In 2003 they also recovered the chassis of P 60 and the engine unit of P 133 on 4 April 2003. In 2014 P 133 was unknownly purchased and was transported to Mosgiel. It will be later transported to Middlemarch for static display for funding so it can be restored to working condition. Also in 2014 DS 201 was purchased by a private owner and transported to Dunedin. The 'DS' is in operational order but requires a repaint. The chassis of P 60 was purchased by the Lumsden Heritage Trust along with three wagons.

In 2016 several pieces of rolling stock were leased to other South Island heritage groups by Southland District Council.  (The tables below have not been updated to reflect these leases.)

Other Rolling Stock

See also  
Ohai Railway Board 
Wairio Branch

References

External links 
 New Zealand Rolling Stock Register
 NZR Rolling Stock Lists

Heritage railways in New Zealand
Railway museums in New Zealand
Rail transport in Southland, New Zealand